K Atchi Reddy is an Indian film producer in the Telugu film industry.

Filmography

As a producer 
 Surya The Great (1990)
 Dharyaptu (1990)
 Kobbari Bondam (1991)
 Rajendrudu Gajendrudu (1993)
 Mayalodu (1993)
 Yamaleela (1994)
 Ghatotkachudu (1995)
 Vinodam (1996)
 Gun Shot (1996)
 Ugadi (1997)
 Deergha Sumangali Bhava (1998)
 Abhishekam (1998)
 Athdey Oka Sainyam (2004)
 Prema Kavali (2011)
 Pula Rangadu (2012)
 Autonagar Surya (2014)

As a presenter 
 Maayajaalam (2006)
 Samanyudu (2006)
 Bahumati (2007)
 Police Story 2 (Telugu) (2007)
 Victory (2008)
 Kick (2009)
 Don Seenu (2010)
 Don]] (2012)

Awards
He won Nandi Award for Best Home - Viewing Feature Film - Mayalodu (1993)

References 

Film producers from Andhra Pradesh
Telugu film producers
People from West Godavari district
Living people
Year of birth missing (living people)